Sharikabad-e Mokhtar Abbaslu (also Romanized as Sharīkābād-e Mokhtār ʿAbbāslū; also known as Sharīkābād-e Mokhtār) is a village in Golestan Rural District, in the Central District of Sirjan County, Kerman Province, Iran. At the 2006 census, its population was 96, in 23 families.

References 

Populated places in Sirjan County